DC Fashion Week is a biennial event in the District of Columbia, United States, held by fashion designers who convene to dress local models who have auditioned for the event. Besides the preview, DCFW consists of four shows, each focusing on a different fashion grouping. In 2018, the four shows were Eco Fashions and Next Generation Designers, the Haiti Fashion Designer Showcase, the Metropolitan Emerging Designers and Indie Artists Showcase, and the 28th International Couture Collections show.

Background
DCFW was founded in 2003 by Ean Williams, a menswear designer for his brand Corjor International. It is known for being the cheapest fashion week for new designers to showcase their designs. In 2014, Williams described the goal of DC Fashion week making "DC a center of international fashion." This goal is furthered by continually featuring international designers; for example the March 2008 show featured designers from Africa, Italy, Atlanta, Colombia, and the Ukraine.

Exhibiting Designers 2019

 Alek Risimnic Couture, 
 Areej Fashions, 
 Dur Doux, 
 Earle Bannister,
 Elizabeth St John,
 Fruwah Boma, 
 Heydari,
 Haus of Falenci’ago, 
 KennyKas,
 Mason Sylvester, 
 Paco Rogiene, 
 Renee France Designs, 
 Stella Bonds,
 Studio D’Maxsi, 
 Taylor Made Designs, 
 Tim Bradley Collection, 
 Victor Hou, 
 ABLE by Amanda Campbell, 
 Alessandra Ricardo, 
 Karyn K Fashions, 
 MIE Sewing, 
 Roots by Bella, 
 Sabrina Seoul Designs, 
 Sarah Christie, 
 2NiteWear, 
 Logan KellyBeauty by God  (Georgia, Turkey, Ukraine), 
 Charlie Mub Couture ( Zimbabwe ), 
 Corjor International (United States), 
 Mikayla by Mikayla Frick (United States),
 Sierra Mitchell (United States)

References

External links

Events in Washington, D.C.
Fashion events in the United States